The Call of Cochin (Appel de Cochin) is a famous discourse published on December 6, 1978, by former Prime Minister of France Jacques Chirac, while he was president of the Rally for the Republic (RPR) party and Mayor of Paris.

Its name derives from the name of the Parisian hospital (Hôpital Cochin) in which Chirac was then being treated following from a car accident in the Corrèze département on November 26. Chirac was then also president of the General Council of the département, and one of its deputies to the National Assembly.

This eurosceptic text, clearly alluding to then president Valéry Giscard d'Estaing and his Union for French Democracy party, criticized the pro-federalist approach of those who sought to expand the power of the European Economic Community. Chirac went even as far as to describe them (without naming them openly) as the "party of the foreigners".

See also
  The text of the Call of Cochin

Jacques Chirac
Euroscepticism in France
1978 in France